"The Running Man" is a short story by American writer Bill Pronzini. The story was originally published in Alfred Hitchcock's Mystery Magazine in January 1968. It was later published again in the Fall-Winter 1979 edition of Alfred Hitchcock's Anthology - Volume 5. Its original copyright belongs to H.S.D. Publications Inc.

Plot
The story takes place at a diner in the warm deserts of Arizona. The protagonist, Jack, walks through the desert thinking about his love, Karen. He arrives at a diner in which the cook and his daughter, the waitress, were alone. Later on, after Jack gets his food, two well-dressed men, Frank and Earl, come into the diner. Unexpectedly, the two men pull out guns, not to rob the place but to quiet the people and prepare them for what is about to happen. They explain that there would shortly be a man coming to the diner, to find a car that will take him to his destination but the car will not be there. Frank and Earl will be instead.

References

1968 short stories
Mystery short stories
Works originally published in Alfred Hitchcock's Mystery Magazine